Cyclophora auricosta is a moth in the family Geometridae. It is found in New Guinea.

References

Moths described in 1916
Cyclophora (moth)
Moths of New Guinea